Isaac Chamberlain (born 3 March 1994) is a British professional boxer.

Professional career 
Chamberlain made his professional debut in January 2015, defeating Moses Matovu in a four-round points victory.

In September 2016, Chamberlain won the BBBofC Southern Area cruiserweight title with a points victory over Wadi Camacho.

He fought London rival Lawrence Okolie on 3 February 2018 at the O2 Arena in a Sky Sports card headlined "British Beef", losing a wide unanimous decision after having been knocked down twice. In preparation for the fight, Chamberlain visited Ukraine to spar with cruiserweights Oleksandr Usyk and Mateusz Masternak.

Chamberlain has worked as a sparring partner for WBC heavyweight champion Deontay Wilder.

Sky Sports produced a documentary on Chamberlain's life, called 'Straight Outta Brixton'.

Professional boxing record

References

External links 
 

|}

1994 births
Living people
English male boxers
People from Brixton
Boxers from Greater London
Cruiserweight boxers